East London Transit (ELT) is a part-segregated bus rapid transit, operated as part of the London Buses network. The East London Transit opened in phases between 2010 and 2013. The scheme for this system was developed by Transport for London to meet the existing and anticipated demand for public transport in East London caused by the Thames Gateway redevelopment, and has been planned to allow for a possible future upgrade to tram operation.

It connects National Rail, London Underground, TfL Rail and London Overground stations in the London boroughs of Havering, Redbridge, and Barking and Dagenham with major population centers, such as Barking Riverside, that are currently only served by bus routes. The first stage of the scheme opened on 20 February 2010. There are proposals for a variety of extensions.

History
The East London Transit (ELT) was developed by Transport for London as an integrated public transport system in conjunction with the London Borough of Barking and Dagenham and the London Borough of Redbridge and other stakeholders.

There are three routes in the East London Transit system. EL1 replaced the previous route 369 bus service and operated 24 hours a day, initially between Thames View Estate and Ilford, and has since been extended from Thames View Estate to Barking Riverside. EL2 operated over the whole length of the phase 1 route between Dagenham Dock and Ilford until March 2016, when it was amended to run to Becontree Heath after leaving Barking. EL3 replaced the previous route 387 operated between Little Heath and Barking Riverside, the route change through Barking Town Centre. As a result of these changes, route 179 was withdrawn between Ilford and Barking and was diverted to terminate at Ilford (Hainault Street) bus terminus.

Each route operates five buses an hour on Monday to Saturday daytimes and three buses an hour during the evenings and on Sunday; this gives a combined frequency of ten buses an hour over the core route from Barking to Thames View Estate during the day.

Delivered phases
Phase 1
Ilford — Barking — Thames View Estate — Dagenham Dock station
Phase 1 commenced on 20 February 2010.

Phase 2
Barking — Thames View Estate — Dagenham Dock 
Construction of phase 2 began in 2011 and was completed in 2013. It received funding from the Homes and Communities Agency.

Extension to Barking Reach
In 2013 it was proposed to extend route EL1 from Thames View Estate to Barking Reach and a consultation was held. The extended service started on 7 September 2013.

Extension to Barking Riverside, Northgate Road 

In 2020, the route EL1 was extended from the Barking Reach terminus to further serve the new housing developments that had been built in the area. The route was extended to terminate at the newly built Northgate Road on the far east side of the development and was routed to pass the new Barking Riverside station and Barking Riverside pier that opened in 2022. Route EL3 also has two schoolday journeys that are extended beyond Mallards Road to Northgate Road, however the route still terminates at Mallards Road at all other times.

Current routes

Route EL1 operates via these primary locations:
Ilford Hill
Barking station   
Vicarage Field Shopping Centre
Creekmouth Waverley Gardens
Thames View Christ Church
Barking Riverside Riverside Centre

Route EL2 operates via these primary locations:
Becontree Heath Leisure Centre
Dagenham Heathway
Becontree Avenue
Barking station   
Vicarage Field Shopping Centre
Creekmouth Waverley Gardens
Thames View Christ Church
Dagenham Dock Terminus for Dagenham Dock station 

Route EL3 operates via these primary locations:

Little Heath Chadwell Heath Lane
King George Hospital
Goodmayes station  
Barking station   
Vicarage Field Shopping Centre
Creekmouth Waverley Gardens
Thames View Christ Church
Barking Riverside Riverside Centre

Vehicles
All services are operated by Blue Triangle using New Routemaster double-deckers. In February 2017, Blue Triangle commenced a new contract on routes EL1 and EL2 along with new route EL3 (which replaced the similarly routed 387). These routes gradually introduced New Routemasters.

Future developments

Proposed destinations
Early proposals for extensions have included Gants Hill for the Central line, Rainham, Barkingside, Romford, Elm Park and Collier Row and Harold Wood. Havering London Borough Council has voiced support for the extension to Rainham through London Riverside.

In a bus network development paper from 2016, a new route EL4 was proposed between Barking Riverside and Becontree Heath bus station via Becontree Underground station. Additional proposals include services to Gallions Reach for the Docklands Light Railway, East Ham, Silvertown and Stratford.

Thames Gateway Transit
The East London Transit formed part of a plan for a much larger Thames Gateway Transit service, which would use the Thames Gateway Bridge to connect to the Greenwich Waterfront Transit on the south side of the River Thames. However, construction of the bridge and the Greenwich busway was cancelled in 2008.

See also
• Red Arrow

References

External links

Transport in the London Borough of Redbridge
Transport in the London Borough of Barking and Dagenham
Thames Gateway
Guided busways and BRT systems in the United Kingdom